The Ethnic Cleansing of Palestine is a book authored by New Historian Ilan Pappé and published in 2006 by One World Oxford.

During the 1948 Palestine war, around 720,000 Palestinian Arabs out of the 900,000 who lived in the territories that became Israel fled or were expelled from their homes. The causes of this exodus are controversial and debated by historians. In his own words, Ilan Pappé "want[s] to make the case for the paradigm of ethnic cleansing and use[s] it to replace the paradigm of war as the basis for the scholarly research of, and public debate about, 1948."

The thesis of the book is that the forced move of Palestinians to the Arab world was an objective of the Zionist movement and a must for the desired character of the Jewish state. According to Pappé, the 1948 Palestinian exodus resulted from a planned ethnic cleansing of Palestine that was implemented by the Zionist movement leaders, mainly David Ben-Gurion and the other ten members of his "consultancy group" as referred to by Pappé. The book argues that the ethnic cleansing was put into effect through systematic expulsions of about 500 Arab villages, as well as terrorist attacks executed mainly by members of the Irgun and Haganah troops against the civilian population. Ilan Pappé also refers to Plan Dalet and to the village files as a proof of the planned expulsions.

Background
The idea that the 1948 events were the results of a planned expulsion had already been suggested by historians Walid Khalidi in Plan Dalet: The Zionist Master Plan for the Conquest of Palestine (1961) and Nur-eldeen Masalha in Expulsion of the Palestinians: The Concept of "Transfer" in Zionist Political Thought (1991). Yoav Gelber published an answer criticizing the interpretation of Plan D made by Walid Khalidi and Ilan Pappé: History and Invention. Was Plan D a Blueprint for Ethnic Cleansing ? (2006)

Benny Morris proposed several interpretations. The conclusion of his main work on the topic The Birth of the Palestinian Refugee Problem (1989) is that the exodus was the "result of war, not intent". Nevertheless, he stated later that "[i]n retrospect, it is clear that what occurred in 1948 in Palestine was a variety of ethnic cleansing of Arab areas by Jews. It is impossible to say how many of the 700,000 or so Palestinians who became refugees in 1948 were physically expelled, as distinct from simply fleeing a combat zone." In an interview to Ha'aretz in 2004, he also defended the idea that having performed an ethnic cleansing in 1948 had been a better choice for the Jews than living a genocide.<ref>'""Survival of the fittest", Ha'aretz, 2004.</ref> In his last book about the 1948 War: 1948: A History the First Arab-Israeli War (2006), he nuanced all this and stated that "[d]uring the 1948 War, (...) although there were expulsions and although an atmosphere of what would later be called ethnic cleansing prevailed during critical months, transfer never became a general or declared Zionist policy. Thus, by war's end, even though much of the country had been "cleansed" of Arabs, other parts of the country -notably central Galilee- were left with substantial Muslim Arab populations (...).".

More recently, Rosemarie Esber in Under the cover of war (2008) concurs with Ilan Pappé and brings new arguments from British documents to support the thesis that the exodus had been planned by the Yishuv leaders.

Critical reception

Analysis in peer-reviewed  journals

Ben Gurion University professor Uri Ram's review in the Middle East Journal concluded that "Pappe provides here a most important and daring book that challenges head-on Israeli historiography" as well as "collective memory and even more importantly Israeli conscience".

Jørgen Jensehaugen, in the Journal of Peace Research, while calling the book "a good read", faults Pappé for claiming that the preplanned expulsion of Palestinians was "the reason for the war", rather than merely "one aspect of the various war plans".

Ephraim Nimni, in the Journal of Palestine Studies, commends Pappé on the book's "polemical character", but claims that the Zionist leaders were not solely responsible for the ethnic cleansing:

Ahmad H. Sa'di, in International Affairs, "highly recommended" the book.

Mainstream media responses
Critical analysis appeared in The New Republic. In his review of The Ethnic Cleansing of Palestine, fellow new historian Benny Morris wrote, "At best, Ilan Pappe must be one of the world's sloppiest historians; at worst, one of the most dishonest. In truth, he probably merits a place somewhere between the two." Morris argued, "Such distortions, large and small, characterize almost every page of The Ethnic Cleansing of Palestine."

Ian Black, The Guardian's Middle East editor, reviewed it, calling it a "catalogue of intimidation, expulsion and atrocity". He also pointed out that Pappé "does historical understanding a disservice by all but ignoring the mood and motives of the Jews, so soon after the end of a war in which six million had been exterminated by the Nazis.

David Pryce-Jones, writing in the Literary Review, calls Pappé "an Israeli academic who has made his name by hating Israel and everything it stands for".

Stephen Howe, professor of the history of colonialism at Bristol University, said that Pappé's book was an often compelling mixture of historical argument and politico-moral tract. According to Howe, while the book will not be the final word on the events of 1948, it is "a major intervention in an argument that will, and must, continue".

See also

 1948: A History of the First Arab-Israeli War Exodus of Palestinians in 1948
 Causes of the 1948 Palestinian exodus
 History of Israel
 1948 Arab–Israeli War
 Depopulated Palestinian locations in Israel
 Nur-eldeen Masalha
 Palestinian refugee

Footnotes

References

 

External links
 Video: Palestine History  - Alan Hart with Ilan Pappé. The author talks about The Ethnic Cleansing of Palestine''

2006 non-fiction books
21st-century history books
Books about the Arab–Israeli conflict
Books by Ilan Pappé
Books critical of Israel
History books about Israel
Israeli–Palestinian conflict books
Oneworld Publications books